KXZS was an American radio station licensed by the Federal Communications Commission (FCC) to broadcast at 107.5 MHz from Wall, South Dakota, covering the Rapid City and Black Hills area from the east. Owned by JER Licenses, it was to become a simulcast with KXZT, which would broadcast on 107.9 from Newell, South Dakota when that station signed on.

The station's license was cancelled by the FCC on August 24, 2016, due to KXZS having been silent for more than twelve months (since March 17, 2015).

External links

XZS
Radio stations established in 2011
2011 establishments in South Dakota
Defunct radio stations in the United States
Radio stations disestablished in 2016
2016 disestablishments in South Dakota

XZS